The Băcin is a left tributary of the river Bega Veche in Romania. It discharges into the Bega Veche near Pișchia.

References

Rivers of Romania
Rivers of Timiș County